Donnis is a unisex given name. Notable persons with the name include:

Donnis Churchwell (1936–2010), American football player
Donnis Thompson (1933–2009), American athletic director and physical education professor

Donnis, stage name of the American rapper Ladonnis Decurtis Crump (born 1984)